Ulla Wiesner (born 12 December 1940) is a German singer.

Wiesner was active from 1963 to 2002 as a singer. In 1965, she represented Germany in the Eurovision Song Contest, with her song, "Paradies, wo bist du?" (Paradise, where are you?). It scored zero points along with three other countries out of the eighteen which entered in total. Past the Eurovision Song Contest, of which the zero point result has hurt her solo career before it even fully began, she was mainly active with the Botho-Lucas-Chorus, where she stayed as chorister as main profession for 30 years, notably for their musical accompaniment on the German TV show Musik ist Trumpf.

Furthermore, there are several songs existing in the Brilliant-Musik archives, which was founded by Werner Tautz, who wrote several songs for Wiesner, together with Heinz Kiessling and Hans Gerig. Wiesner released an album called Twilight Mood in 1970 with Addy Flor and his Orchestra. As one of Germany's busiest studio singers, she was assigned as backing vocalist for many popular artists, including Triumvirat's album Illusions on a Double Dimple in 1974. Since then, notable singles of hers include titles such as "Abends kommen die Sterne" ("In the evening the stars appear"), "Wenn dieser Tag zu Ende geht" ("When this day comes to an end") and "Charade".

Personal life
Wiesner married the German TV producer and personality Alexander Arnz (1932–2004) in 1999 with whom she has two sons.

Discography

Singles
1964: "Charade" / "Joe oder Jonny"
1964: "Abends kommen die Sterne" / "Der rote Mohn"
1965: "Paradies, wo bist du?" / "Sag, weißt du denn, was Liebe ist?"
1965: "Wenn dieser Tag zu Ende geht" / "My Darling, My Love"
1967: "Das Wunder der Liebe" / "Mann der Träume"
1974: "Chico de favella" / "Tristezza"
1975: "Tanz keinen Tango mit Django" / "Ich bin ein total moderner Typ" (Charleston)
1980: "Blütenfest in Santa Fé" / "Träume von gestern"
1993: "Haut an Haut" / "Im Wartesaal zum großen Glück" / "Geh' deinen Weg" / "Die große Freiheit" / "Wiedermal verliebt"

Other releases
Album names in parentheses:
 1964: Abends kommen die Sterne (Die große POLYDOR-Starparade)
 1970: Vergessen und vorbei / So lang' die Welt sich für uns dreht / Sommer in Paris / Dieses Jahr (Die Orchester Addy Flor und Pete Jacques – Twilight Mood)
 Sprich dich mal Aus (Deutsche Schlagerparade)
 Niemandsland (Erwin Lehn und sein Südfunk-Orchester)
 1990: Paradies, wo bist du? (Die Sieger des deutschen Grand Prix - 1956 - 1990)
 1999: Dieses Jahr (Snowflakes)
 1999: Die Träume von gestern (25 Schlager Mit Herz Folge 1)
 2000: Vergessen und vorbei (Days of Summer: 27 Sensational Bossa Nova and Easy Tunes from the Brilliant-Musik Archive)
 2001: Paradies, wo bist du? (Alle Sieger des deutschen Grand Prix 1956 - 2000)
 2004: Charade / Joe oder Jonny (Vinyl Raritäten 13)
 2006: Sommer in Paris / Dieses Jahr / Vergessen und vorbei (Days of Summer: 24 Dreamy Vocals & Bossa Nova Pearls)
 2012: Träume von gestern (Träume von gestern)

Collaboration 
 1974 : Illusions on a double dimple by Triumvirat

References

Sources

External links
 

1941 births
Living people
Musicians from Munich
Polydor Records artists
German women singers
Eurovision Song Contest entrants of 1965
Eurovision Song Contest entrants for Germany